Gary Daniel Geldart (born June 14, 1950) is a Canadian retired professional ice hockey defenceman. Geldart was drafted by the Minnesota North Stars in 1970, and he played in four games with the teamduring the 1970–71 season. The remainder of Geldart's seven seasons as a professional player were spent in the American Hockey League. After his playing career, Geldart served as head hockey coach at University School in Hunting Valley, Ohio.

Geldart was born in Moncton, New Brunswick.

Career statistics

Regular season and playoffs

References

External links
 

1950 births
Living people
Canadian ice hockey defencemen
Cleveland Barons (1937–1973) players
Hamilton Red Wings (OHA) players
Ice hockey people from New Brunswick
Jacksonville Barons players
London Knights players
Minnesota North Stars draft picks
Minnesota North Stars players
New Haven Nighthawks players
Nova Scotia Voyageurs players
Sportspeople from Moncton